The Capiznons (Capiznon: mga Kapisnon; Spanish: capiceños) are a Visayan ethnic group native to  Capiz and the surrounding areas of the Western Visayas region of the Philippines. They speak Capiznon, a Visayan language.

Notable Capiznons (Capizeños)
This list includes people with roots from Capiz.

Art
Pierre Patricio, Self-taught visual artist

Business
Edgar Sia, is the chairman of DoubleDragon Properties and the founder of Mang Inasal fast food restaurant chain

Politics
Jocelyn Bolante, Politician who formerly served as an Undersecretary of the Department of Agriculture of the Philippines.
Fredenil Castro, A member of the National Unity Party, he has been elected to five terms as a Member of the House of Representatives of the Philippines, representing the Second District of Capiz. 
Pedro Gil, was a physician, journalist, and legislator. He was elected representative for the south district of Manila on the Democratra party ticket. He became Minority Floor Leader in the House of Representatives of the Philippines.
Manuel Roxas, the fifth President of the Philippines and the 1913 bar topnotcher
Gerardo Roxas, Philippine Senator and son of President Manuel Roxas
 Mar Roxas, former Senator of the Republic of the Philippines and former Secretary of DOTC, DTI and DILG
Gerardo Roxas, Jr., grandson of President Manuel Roxas and former Congressman
Roy Señeres, Filipino statesman and diplomat 
Antonio Trillanes, is a retired Navy officer and former Philippines senator.
Cornelio Villareal, was a Filipino politician who served as Speaker of the House of Representatives of the Philippines from 1962 to 1967, and again from 1971 to 1972. Popularly known as Kune, his congressional career representing the Second District of Capiz spanned six decades.

Entertainment
Daisy Avellana, actress and theater director
Sharmaine Arnaiz, actress.
Gina Alajar, actress and director
Ryan Eigenmann, actor and son of Gina Alajar
Geoff Eigenmann, actor, brother of Ryan Eigenmann, son of Gina Alajar

Charlie Davao, actor
Ricky Davao, actor and director.
 Edu Manzano, actor, politician and endorser.
 Luis Manzano, actor, host and endorser.
 Jo Berry, actress.
 Jovita Fuentes, national artist for music.

Media
Paolo Bediones, Filipino commercial model, television host, journalist, newscaster and radio announcer
 Kara David, television host and journalist.

Medicine
Vicki Belo, well-known dermatologist, daughter of Enrique “Ike” Belo of Pan-ay Capiz

Music
Barbie Almalbis, rock artist, former frontman of Barbie's Cradle and Hungry Young Poets
Emil Mijares, was a jazz vibist and pianist, and was a musical director on Filipino television, as well as a composer, arranger, bandleader and producer.
Mikoy Morales, is an actor, Singer & Model. He joined the Protégé: The Battle For The Big Artista Break.
Jovita Fuentes, Dubbed the First Lady of Philippine Music. The first female recipient of the National Artist Award.
Linn Bermudez, is a singer-artist. She joined the Protege: The Battle For The Big Break and finished third place in the finals.

Beauty Pageants
Margarita Moran-Floirendo, Miss Universe 1973
Geraldine Villarruz Asis,  Bb. Pilipinas-Universe 1987, Miss Universe 1987 finalist

Social sciences
Josepha Abiertas first female Filipino lawyer and bar topnotcher
Eugene A. Tan, Human rights lawyer, author, and professor of law. He was murdered in 1994.

Sports
Mac Belo, basketball player. A son of a  Capiznon from Pan-ay, Capiz who migrated to Cotabato.
 Jeckster Apinan, professional basketball player.
 Peter Glenn Yap, former professional basketball player.

Indigenous Capiznon religion

Immortals

Laon: the supreme deity; a goddess said to reside in the mountain at the neighboring island of Negros
Bulalakaw: a bird god who looks like a peacock and can cause illnesses; lives in Mount Madja-as
Mediators to the Gods
Bangutbanwa: ensures good harvests and an orderly universe
Mangindalon: intercedes for sick persons; punishes enemies
Soliran: one of two performers of the marriage ceremonies
Solian: one of two performers of the marriage ceremonies
Manunubo: the good spirit of the sea
Tungkung Langit: the god of the sky who brings famine, drought, storms, and floods
Lulid-Batang: the god of the earth, responsible for earthquakes and volcanic eruptions
Linting Habughabug: the god of lightning, whose look kills people and who shouts in anger
Launsina: the goddess of the sun, moon, stars, and seas, and the most beloved because people seek forgiveness from her
Burigadang Pada Sinaklang Bulawan: the goddess of greed to whom people pray when they want to get rich
Saragnayan: the god of darkness who has the power to replace brightness with darkness
Lubay-lubyuk Hanginun si Mahuyuk-huyukun: the goddess of the evening breeze; cools people, especially during the summer
Suklang Malayun: the guardian of happy homes
Maklilum-sa-twan: the god of the plains and valleys.
Agurang: the good spirit who fought against Asuwang
Asuwang: the malevolent spirit who fought against Asuwang

See also
Capiz
Capiznon language
Negrito
 Visayan people
 Aklanon people
 Boholano people
 Cebuano people
 Cuyunon people
 Eskaya people
 Hiligaynon people
 Karay-a people
 Masbateño people
 Porohanon people
 Romblomanon people
 Suludnon
 Waray people
Lumad
Moro people

References

Ethnic groups in Panay
Visayan people
Capiz
People from Capiz